Zaw Win Thet (born 1 March 1991 in Kyonpyaw, Pathein District, Ayeyarwady Division, Myanmar) is a Burmese runner who competed in the 400 m event at the 2012 Summer Olympics. He was the flag bearer of Myanmar sports team at the opening ceremony.

References

External links
 

1991 births
Living people
Burmese male sprinters
Athletes (track and field) at the 2012 Summer Olympics
Olympic athletes of Myanmar
World Athletics Championships athletes for Myanmar
People from Ayeyarwady Region